The Black Box is a 1915 American drama film serial directed by Otis Turner. This serial is considered to be lost. The film was written in part by E. Phillips Oppenheim, a popular novelist at the time. The story was published in 1915 as a novel and as a newspaper serial. Both published editions were illustrated by photographic stills taken from the movie serial. In the novel version, about 30 stills from the movie are preserved. These can be seen in the Gutenberg.org version.

Cast
 Herbert Rawlinson as Sanford Quest
 Ann Little as Lenora MacDougal (credited as Anna Little)
 William Worthington as Prof. Ashleigh / Lord Ashleigh
 Mark Fenton as Police officer
 Laura Oakley as Laura, Quest's assistant
 Frank MacQuarrie as Craig
 Frank Lloyd as Ian MacDouglas
 Helen Wright as Lady Ashleigh
 Beatrice Van as Ashleigh's daughter
 Hylda Hollis as Mrs. Bruce Reinholdt (credited as Hilda Sloman)
 J. Edwin Brown
 Dorothy Brown
 Duke Worne
 Harry Tenbrook as Thug
 Lionel Bradshaw
 Osborne Chase

Chapter titles

An Apartment House Mystery
The Hidden Hands
The Pocket Wireless
An Old Grudge
On the Rack
The Unseen Terror
The House of Mystery
The Inherited Sin
Lost in London
The Ship of Horror
A Desert Vengeance
’Neath Iron Wheels
Tongues of Flame
A Bolt from the Blue
The Black Box

See also
 List of American films of 1915
 List of film serials
 List of film serials by studio

References

External links

Oppenheim, Edward Phillips (1915), The Black Box, New York: Grosset & Dunlap, with stills from the 1915 film serial, on the Internet Archive

1915 films
1915 drama films
1915 lost films
American black-and-white films
American silent serial films
Silent American drama films
Lost American films
Lost drama films
Films directed by Otis Turner
Universal Pictures film serials
1910s American films